Cowrock Mountain is a mountain that is located in Lumpkin and White counties in Georgia. The mountain forms a north/south ridge. The boundary line between Lumpkin and White counties follows the ridge formed by Cowrock Mountain. The peak called Cowrock is the highest point in Lumpkin County, forms the northeast corner of the county. The Appalachian Trail also crosses Cowrock Mountain. The mountain is located within the Raven Cliffs Wilderness in the Chattahoochee National Forest.

Sources
Georgia's Named Summits - Lumpkin County

External links

TopoQuest map of Cowrock Mountain

Mountains of Georgia (U.S. state)
Mountains of Lumpkin County, Georgia
Mountains of White County, Georgia
Mountains on the Appalachian Trail
Chattahoochee-Oconee National Forest